Shin Dol-seok (hangul: 신돌석) was a Korean general of the Righteous Armies who fought against the Japanese army in the early 20th century. He was born in Yeonghae (now Yeongdeok), North Gyeongsang Province.

Military career
Because of the Eulmi Incident, in which a Korean empress was killed by the Japanese army, and an ordinance prohibiting topknot hairstyles, anti-Japanese sentiment was active. Armies were raised against Japan from every corner of the country. 
At that time, 19-year-old Shin Dol-seok participated in the anti-Japanese movement raising 100 soldiers. In 1905, the Eulsa Treaty (also known as the Japan-Korea Protectorate Treaty), made a pact between Korea and Japan. Due to the unequal and compulsory nature of the treaty, many people, including Shin Dol-seok, struggled against the Japanese army. In 1907, Korea signed another unequal treaty with Japan, at which time the previously irregular Righteous Armies finally formed a union against the Japanese army. However, other generals ruled Shin Dol-seok out of the union because he was a commoner. In the Korea of that time, it was not easy for a commoner to lead an army because of the strong adherence to the status system. However, his successful leadership using guerrilla tactics led many people to welcome his army. In 1962, he was awarded for his distinguished services by the Korean government.

References 

Anti-Japanese sentiment in Korea
Korean generals
Korean independence movement